Primula utahensis, synonym Dodecatheon utahense, is a species of flowering plant in the family Primulaceae, native to Utah. It was first described by Noel Holmgren in 1994 as Dodecatheon dentatum var. utahense. In 2006, it was raised to a separate species as Dodecatheon utahense. When Dodecatheon was sunk into Primula in 2007, it was transferred to that genus as Primula utahensis.

References

utahensis
Flora of Utah
Plants described in 1994
Flora without expected TNC conservation status